Captain Richard Magenis (1710–1807) was an Anglo-Irish politician who sat in the House of Commons in the Parliament of Ireland.

Early life and career

Magenis, whose surname is also spelt Magennis or Maginnis, was Anglo-Irish gentry. He was the eldest son of Richard Magenis of Dublin and Alicia Caddell, daughter of William Caddell of Downpatrick, County Down. He was the elder brother of Very Rev. William Magenis, Dean of Kilmore.

He represented Bangor from 1783–90, Fore (1794–98), and then Carlingford from 1798 until 31 December 1800, when it was dissolved upon the Union of Great Britain and Ireland.

He also served as High Sheriff of Antrim in 1760, High Sheriff of Armagh in 1762, and High Sheriff of Down in 1764. He died in 1807, aged 96.

Marriage and issue
Richard Magenis married firstly, 5 December 1760, to a Miss Wray, who died shortly after. On 31 December 1767, he married secondly, Elizabeth Berkeley (died 5 April 1831), daughter of Col. William Berkeley and sister of George Berkeley, Bishop of Cloyne. They had two sons and five daughters:

Richard Magenis (–1831), MP for Enniskillen
Very Rev. William Magenis (–1825),  Dean of Kilmore
Ellen, married Col. Charles Albert Leslie, of Tandragee
Louisa, married William Richardson, M.P. for Armagh
Emily, married Very Rev. John French, Dean of Elphin
Alice
Harriette

References

1710s births
1807 deaths
Date of birth missing
Date of death missing
Irish Anglicans
19th-century Irish people
People from County Down
Irish MPs 1776–1783
Irish MPs 1783–1790
Members of the Parliament of Ireland (pre-1801) for County Down constituencies
High Sheriffs of Down
High Sheriffs of Antrim